Peter R. Deutsch (born April 1, 1957) is an American politician from the U.S. state of Florida. Deutsch was a Democratic Representative from Florida's 20th congressional district from 1993 until 2005.

Background 
Deutsch was born in the borough of the Bronx in New York City in 1957.

He graduated from the Horace Mann School in 1975 and attended Swarthmore College, graduating with a Bachelor of Arts degree in 1979. In college, he worked as an intern for the Senate Judiciary Committee. Deutsch graduated from Yale Law School with a Juris Doctor in 1982.

After graduating from Yale, Deutsch moved to Broward County, Florida, where he was a lawyer in private practice. He founded the nonprofit Medicare Information Program of Broward County, while working to help Medicare recipients in the area, and served as the group's director during 1982.

In 1982, Deutsch was elected for the first of five two-year terms in the Florida House of Representatives, where he wrote legislation protecting seniors from illegal nursing home evictions.

In the 1992 House election Deutsch was elected to the United States House of Representatives. He was reelected in 1994, 1996, 1998, 2000, and 2002. Several times, including in 2000 and 2002, he ran for reelection unopposed. In the House he became the ranking member of the Subcommittee on Oversight and Investigations of the Energy and Commerce Committee, which investigated amongst other things the Enron scandal, the Firestone Tire issue, NIH Conflicts and Martha Stewart’s ImClone stock trading case. Deutsch served from January 3, 1993, to January 3, 2005.

During the Florida election recount after the 2000 presidential election, Deutsch led many of the recount efforts in Broward County and brought the motion to the floor of the Senate to contest the results of the 2000 election, an effort that had been seconded by Alcee Hastings.

U.S. Senate race, 2004
In 2004, Deutsch declared his candidacy for the Democratic nomination for the Senate seat being vacated in 2005 by retiring Democratic Senator Bob Graham. Although Deutsch consistently led opinion polls in the Miami-Fort Lauderdale metropolitan area, and had the largest amount of cash on hand for most of the race, he lagged in statewide opinion polls behind rival Betty Castor, whose fundraising dramatically accelerated during the summer of 2004 with the help of EMILY's List, which contributed close to $4.5 million in television and advertising dollars. The Castor campaign was accused of inappropriate coordination with EMILY's List, and a lawsuit was filed with the Federal Elections Commission.

In May 2004, Deutsch hired Roy Teicher, a former television writer, newspaper reporter and editor, as his communications director. In June 2004, he hired Sanford Dickert, CTO for the John Kerry for President Campaign, as his Director of Internet Strategy. In June, he came under heavy criticism from the Castor campaign after American Democracy Project, a 527 group run by Bernie Friedman, began attacking Castor's handling of the Sami al-Arian incident. On March 2, 2006, Al-Arian entered a guilty plea to a charge of conspiracy to help the Palestinian Islamic Jihad, a "specially designated terrorist" organization.  He was sentenced to 57 months in prison, and ordered deported following his prison term.  Deutsch denied any involvement in the ADP efforts and denounced their tactics in public.

Later in the campaign, Senator Bob Graham and Florida’s other senator Bill Nelson proposed a pledge between Castor, Deutsch, and Alex Penelas to refrain from negative campaigning; Deutsch agreed to the pledge, but added a clause allowing him to raise "legitimate" electability issues. Deutsch released an ad questioning the veracity of Castor's statements on the investigation and suspension of al-Arian.

Deutsch was defeated by Castor in the Democratic primary on August 31, winning only three counties (Miami-Dade, Broward, and Monroe). Castor went on to lose the Senate election to Republican nominee Mel Martinez. Deutsch was unable to run for reelection to the House because of his Senate campaign, and was succeeded by the new Democratic candidate, Debbie Wasserman Schultz.

Personal life
Deutsch currently resides in Ra'anana, Israel, with his family. However, he has not taken Israeli citizenship, does not speak Hebrew, and frequently visits Florida.
He also founded Ben Gamla Charter School in Hollywood, Florida. Deutsch and his wife Lori have two children, Jonathan and Danielle.

Electoral history

Write-in and minor candidate notes:  In 2000, write-ins received 187 votes.

**According to Florida law, no totals need be submitted when there is no opposition.

See also
 List of Jewish members of the United States Congress

References

External links
Profile from the Biographical Directory of the United States Congress
Profile from the Jewish Virtual Library
U.S. Senate campaign official website–archive from the Internet Archive

|-

|-

1957 births
Living people
Democratic Party members of the Florida House of Representatives
Politicians from the Bronx
Swarthmore College alumni
Yale Law School alumni
Horace Mann School alumni
Jewish members of the United States House of Representatives
American expatriates in Israel
21st-century American politicians
Democratic Party members of the United States House of Representatives from Florida
21st-century American Jews